Hialeah Senior High School is a public high school located at 251 E 47th Street in Hialeah, Florida, United States.

History
Hialeah Senior High School opened in September 1954.

In April 2012, Alberto M. Carvalho, the superintendent of Miami-Dade County Public Schools, awarded Natalie Antunez the $250,000 Leonore Annenberg Scholarship Fund.

Academics 
The state's accountability program grades a school by a complex formula that looks at both current scores and annual improvement on the Reading, Math, Writing and Science FCATs.

Demographics

Hialeah Senior High School is 94% Hispanic, 4% Black, and 2%  White non-Hispanic. The school has a high proportion of foreign-born students, with 57.8% students born outside of the United States (50.1% Cuba, 4.4% Nicaragua, 2.0% Panama).

Athletics 
In 2013, Alin Edouard, the quarterback of the school's football team, decommitted from the University of Miami Hurricanes.

Accolades
 Baseball: won the State Title in 1969, 2001, and 2002

Extracurricular accomplishments

Band  
 1964: the Marching Thoroughbred Band played in the Florida Pavilion at the New York World's Fair
 1967-68:  one of the featured bands at Super Bowl 2 (Raiders vs. Packers) halftime show
 1968-69:  featured band at University of Florida homecoming halftime show; escorted Queen's Float in Orange Bowl Parade; featured band at Super Bowl 3 (Colts vs Jets) halftime show; a top ten national marching band in the Disney Band Competition
 2011: Florida Marching Band Competition 1A State Champions
 2014: Florida Marching Band Competition 1A State Champions
 2015: Florida Marching Band Competition 1A State Champions

Chorus  
The TBS (T-Bred Singers) have placed first in The Miracle Mile Caroling Competition's show choir category for the past 30 years, since it began.

Notable alumni
 Larry Brodsky, former USFL wide receiver
 Harry Wayne Casey, singer/songwriter/producer, founder of KC and the Sunshine Band
 Randy Coffield, former NFL linebacker
 Nestor Cortes Jr., professional baseball pitcher for the New York Yankees, pitched in the 2022 MLB All Star Game
 Paris Cotton, former CFL running back
 Bucky Dent, former professional baseball player for the New York Yankees, 1978 World Series MVP
 George Enright, former professional baseball player for the Chicago White Sox
David Freeman, Olympian, competed in the 1500 meters at the 2008 Beijing Olympics
Gio González, baseball player for the Chicago White Sox
 Ted Hendricks, former Pro Football Hall of Fame linebacker for the Baltimore Colts, Green Bay Packers, and Oakland/LA Raiders, 4 Super Bowl wins 
 Charlie Hough, former professional baseball player
 Ross Jones, former professional baseball player for the New York Mets, Seattle Mariners, and Kansas City Royals
Shawn Jones (born 1992), basketball player for Hapoel Haifa of the Israeli Basketball Premier League.
 Corey Lemonier, former NFL linebacker for the San Francisco 49ers
 Corey Liuget, NFL lineman for the San Diego Chargers, selected in the 1st round of the 2011 NFL Draft
 Adewale Ojomo, former NFL defensive end for the New York Giants
 George Ortuzar, actor/comedian/television host
 Henry Polic II, stage, screen, and voice actor
 Roell Preston, former professional football player
 Jon Secada, Grammy-winning singer/songwriter
 Alan Wiggins, former professional baseball player
 Pedro Zamora, HIV/AIDS educator; The Real World: San Francisco television personality

References

External links
Hialeah Senior High School
Miami-Dade County public schools
 Hialeah High School's information
Hialeah High baseball
The Hialeah High Record paper online
Golden Thoroughbreds
 Alumni class lists

Educational institutions established in 1954
Miami-Dade County Public Schools high schools
1954 establishments in Florida
 
Education in Hialeah, Florida